The 2019 Newfoundland and Labrador general election was held on May 16, 2019, to elect members of the 49th General Assembly of Newfoundland and Labrador.

Despite consistent Progressive Conservative leads in polling towards the end of the campaign, including a nine-point lead in the final poll released a day before the election, the Liberal Party led by Dwight Ball won re-election, but nonetheless fell one seat short of retaining their majority after an unexpected loss to the New Democrats in Labrador West originally in the initial count by five votes. This resulted in the Liberals winning 20 seats, exactly half of the House of Assembly. A subsequent recount shortened the margin of victory in Labrador West to just two votes.

Party standings

|- style="background:#ccc;"
! rowspan="2" colspan="2" style="text-align:left;"|Party
! rowspan="2" style="text-align:left;"|Party leader
!rowspan="2"|Candidates
! colspan="4" style="text-align:center;"|Seats
! colspan="3" style="text-align:center;"|Popular vote
|- style="background:#eee;"
| style="text-align:center;"|2015
| style="text-align:center;"|Dissol.
| style="text-align:center;"|2019
| style="text-align:center;"|Change
| style="text-align:center;"|#
| style="text-align:center;"|%
| style="text-align:center;"|% Change

| style="text-align:left;" |Dwight Ball
| style="text-align:right;" |40
| style="text-align:right;" |31
| style="text-align:right;" |27
| style="text-align:right;" |20
| style="text-align:right;" |11
| style="text-align:right;" |93,745
| style="text-align:right;" |44.00
| style="text-align:right;" |13.3

| style="text-align:left;" |Ches Crosbie
| style="text-align:right;" |38
| style="text-align:right;" |7
| style="text-align:right;" |8
| style="text-align:right;" |15
| style="text-align:right;" |8
| style="text-align:right;" |90,689
| style="text-align:right;" |42.57
| style="text-align:right;" |12.5

| style="text-align:left;" |Alison Coffin
| style="text-align:right;" |14
| style="text-align:right;" |2
| style="text-align:right;" |2
| style="text-align:right;" |3
| style="text-align:right;" |1
| style="text-align:right;" |13,434
| style="text-align:right;" |6.31
| style="text-align:right;" |5.8

| style="text-align:left;" |Graydon Pelley
| style="text-align:right;" |9
| style="text-align:right;" |-
| style="text-align:right;" |-
| style="text-align:right;" |0
| style="text-align:right;" |
| style="text-align:right;" |5,086
| style="text-align:right;" |2.39
| style="text-align:right;" |

| style="text-align:left;" colspan="2"|Independents
| style="text-align:right;" |10
| style="text-align:right;" |-
| style="text-align:right;" |3
| style="text-align:right;" |2
| style="text-align:right;" |2
| style="text-align:right;" |10,096
| style="text-align:right;" |4.74
| style="text-align:right;" |4.0
|-
| style="text-align:left;" colspan="3"|Invalid votes
| style="text-align:right;"| -
| style="text-align:right;"| -
| style="text-align:right;"| -
| style="text-align:right;"| -
| style="text-align:right;"|-
| style="text-align:right;"|1,757
| style="text-align:right;"|-
| style="text-align:right;"|-
|-
| style="text-align:left;" colspan="3"|Total
| style="text-align:right;"|111
| style="text-align:right;"|40
| style="text-align:right;"|40
| style="text-align:right;"|40
| style="text-align:right;"|-
| style="text-align:right;"|214,807
| style="text-align:right;"|100
| style="text-align:right;"|-
|-
| style="text-align:left;" colspan="3"|Registered voters/turnout
| style="text-align:right;"| -
| style="text-align:right;"| -
| style="text-align:right;"| -
| style="text-align:right;"| -
| style="text-align:right;"|-
| style="text-align:right;"|354,136
| style="text-align:right;"|60.66
| style="text-align:right;"|-
|}

Incumbents not running for reelection
The following MHAs had announced that they would not be running in this provincial election:

Independent
Dale Kirby (Mount Scio)

New Democratic Party
Gerry Rogers (St. John's Centre)
Lorraine Michael (St. John's East-Quidi Vidi)

Progressive Conservative Party
Keith Hutchings (Ferryland)
Tracey Perry (Fortune Bay-Cape La Hune)

Timeline

2015
November 30, 2015 – The Liberal Party of Newfoundland and Labrador wins 31 of the 40 seats in the House of Assembly during the general election ending 12 years of Progressive Conservative rule and defeating incumbent premier Paul Davis.
2016
May 19, 2016 - Liberal MHA Paul Lane is suspended from the Liberal caucus and sits as an independent MHA.
October 11, 2016 - Former premier Paul Davis announces he'll resign as Tory leader once his successor is chosen.
2017
 July 31, 2017 - A cabinet shuffle takes place after Cathy Bennett resigns as Finance Minister. Dempster and Osborne enter cabinet.
 September 19, 2017 - NDP Leader Earle McCurdy announced his resignation as Party Leader, effective September 30.
 September 28, 2017 - NDP MHA Lorraine Michael is named interim leader of the NDP replacing Earle McCurdy who announced his resignation earlier in the month.
 October 11, 2017 - Mount Pearl North PC MHA Steve Kent resigns to become Chief Administrative Officer of Mount Pearl triggering a by-election.
November 21, 2017 - Jim Lester (PC) is elected as MHA for Mount Pearl North.
2018
April 8, 2018 - Gerry Rogers is elected as the leader of the New Democrats, succeeding Lorraine Michael.
April 25, 2018 - Municipal Affairs Minister Eddie Joyce is formally accused of inappropriate conduct by another Liberal MHA. He is subsequently removed from cabinet and caucus pending the outcome of an external investigation.
April 28, 2018 - Ches Crosbie is elected as the new leader of the Progressive Conservatives, succeeding Paul Davis.
April 30, 2018 - Minister of Education and Early Childhood Development Dale Kirby is removed from cabinet and caucus following allegations of harassment.
May 13, 2018 - Paul Davis announces his resignation as Leader of the Opposition. Since PC leader Ches Crosbie does not have a seat in the House of Assembly MHA David Brazil was appointed Leader of the Opposition on May 14, 2018.
June 16, 2018 - Delegates at the Liberal Party Annual General Meeting vote to endorse the leadership of Dwight Ball with 79% voting against the party holding a leadership convention.
August 21, 2018 - Liberal MHA Cathy Bennett resigns her seat of Windsor Lake.
August 27, 2018 - CBC releases a copy of a report by the Commissioner for Legislative Standards that clears Eddie Joyce and Dale Kirby of wrongdoing in all the allegations made by fellow Liberal MHA Colin Holloway.
 September 20, 2018 - Ches Crosbie (PC) is elected as MHA for Windsor Lake.
 October 18, 2018 - Paul Davis (PC) announces his intention to resign as MHA for Topsail-Paradise on November 2.
 October 20, 2018 - MHA Dale Kirby leaks the results of the Commissioner for Legislative Standards report regarding MHA Pam Parsons’ complaint against him to the public. Kirby was cleared on all complaints, except making an inappropriate comment to Parsons at the 2016 Liberal Party AGM; the report recommended a sanction by the House of Assembly on that count.
 October 21, 2018 - The Joyce report is leaked to the public which found that Joyce had broken the code of conduct for elected officials when he lobbied Minister Gambin-Walsh to hire a friend of his for a government job; Joyce was cleared on all other allegations.
 October 30, 2018 - PC party president Graydon Pelley resigns and creates a new political party, the NL Alliance.
 November 8, 2018 - Cabinet shuffle takes place MHAs Davis, Haley, and Letto promoted to cabinet.
 November 16, 2018 - MHA Eddie Joyce confirms he has been denied re-entry into the Liberal caucus.
2019
 January 24, 2019 - Paul Dinn (PC) is elected as MHA for Topsail-Paradise.
 February 12, 2019 - NDP Leader Gerry Rogers announced she would be stepping down as leader and not seeking re-election in 2019.
 March 5, 2019 - Alison Coffin is acclaimed leader of the NDP.
April 12, 2019 - The NL Alliance is officially registered as a political party in Newfoundland and Labrador.
April 16, 2019 - Budget is tabled in the House of Assembly.
April 17, 2019 - Premier Ball visits Lt. Gov. Judy Foote and the writ is dropped.
June 21, 2019 - A judicial recount confirms Jordan Brown as MHA for Labrador West by a margin of 2 votes.

Opinion polls

Results by region

Candidates by district
All candidate names are those on the official list of confirmed candidates; names in media or on party website may differ slightly.
Names in boldface type represent party leaders.
† represents that the incumbent is not running again.
§ represents that the incumbent was defeated for nomination.
₰ represents that the incumbent ran in another district and lost the nomination
‡ represents that the incumbent is running in a different district.

St. John's

|-
| style="background:whitesmoke;"| Mount Scio54.51% turnout
||
|Sarah Stoodley1,98141.68%
|
|Lloyd Power1,76937.21%
|
|Jason R. Mercer59712.56%
|
|Graydon Pelley4068.54%
||
|Dale Kirby†
|-
| style="background:whitesmoke;"|St. John's Centre48.60% turnout
|
|Seamus O'Keefe1,20725.54%
|
|Jonathan Galgay1,30127.53%
||
|Jim Dinn2,21846.93%
|
|
||
|Gerry Rogers†
|-
| style="background:whitesmoke;"|St. John's East-Quidi Vidi58.03% turnout
|
|George Murphy2,07233.38%
|
|David Porter1,43623.14%
||
|Alison Coffin2,69943.48%
|
|
||
| Lorraine Michael†
|-
| style="background:whitesmoke;"|St. John's West57.31% turnout
||
|Siobhan Coady2,39345.69%
|
|Shane Skinner2,21142.22%
|
|Brenda Walsh63312.09%
|
|
||
|Siobhan Coady
|-
| style="background:whitesmoke;"|Virginia Waters-Pleasantville63.64% turnout
||
|Bernard Davis2,76144.25%
|
|Beth Crosbie2,21735.53%
|
|Jenn Deon1,26220.22%
|
|
||
|Bernard Davis
|-
|style="background-color:whitesmoke"|Waterford Valley52.54% turnout
||
|Tom Osborne3,48768.56%
|
|
|
|Matthew Cooper1,59931.44%
|
|
||
|Tom Osborne
|-
| style="background:whitesmoke;"|Windsor Lake59.65% turnout
|
| Bob Osborne2,08838.47%
||
|Ches Crosbie2,64448.71%
|
|Tomás Shea69612.82%
|
|
||
|Ches Crosbie
|}

St. John's suburbs

|-
| style="background:whitesmoke;"|Cape St. Francis71.40% turnout
|
| Michael Duffy1,11517.75%
||
|Kevin Parsons4,53972.24%
|
|Peter Beck3966.30%
|
|Ryan Lane2333.71%  
|
|
||
|Kevin Parsons
|-
| style="background:whitesmoke;"|Conception Bay East – Bell Island55.56% turnout
|
| Cyril Hayden1,55126.22%
||
|David Brazil4,36573.78%
|
|
|
|
|
|
||
|David Brazil
|-
| style="background:whitesmoke;"|Conception Bay South61.85% turnout
|
| Kevin Baker1,25622.78%
||
|Barry Petten3,44762.52%
|
|
|
|Warrick Butler81014.69% 
|
|
||
|Barry Petten
|-
| style="background:whitesmoke;"|Mount Pearl North57.88% turnout
|
|Nicole Kieley2,19637.20%
||
|Jim Lester2,90749.24%
|
|Carol Reade3586.06%
|
|William Neville4437.50% 
|
|
||
|Jim Lester
|-
| style="background:whitesmoke;"|Mount Pearl-Southlands65.71% turnout
|
|Hasan Hai1,82628.30%
|
|Gillian Pearson1,59024.64%
|
|David Brake2143.32%
|
|
||
|Paul Lane (Ind.)2,82343.75%
||
|Paul Lane
|-
| style="background:whitesmoke;"|Topsail-Paradise54.75% turnout
|
|Patricia Hynes-Coates1,65028.95%
||
|Paul Dinn3,47660.98%
|
|
|
|Lori Best-Moore57410.07%
|
|
||
|Paul Dinn
|}

Avalon Peninsula

|-
| style="background:whitesmoke;"|Carbonear-Trinity-Bay de Verde66.57% turnout
||
|Steve Crocker4,29260.28%
|
|Jason Oliver2,42234.02%
|
|Kathleen Burt3534.96%
|
|Edward Thomas Cole (Ind.)530.74%
||
|Steve Crocker
|-
| style="background:whitesmoke;"|Ferryland69.27% turnout
|
|Janice Ryan2,35034.95%
||
|Loyola O'Driscoll4,07460.59%
|
|
|
|Chris Molloy (Ind.)3004.46%
||
|Keith Hutchings†
|-
| style="background:whitesmoke;"|Harbour Grace-Port de Grave71.18% turnout
||
| Pam Parsons3,75852.24%
|
|Glenn Littlejohn3,40847.56%
|
|
|
|
||
|Pam Parsons
|-
| style="background:whitesmoke;"|Harbour Main69.85% turnout
|
|Betty Parsley2,12630.64%
||
|Helen Conway-Ottenheimer4,16960.08%
|
|
|
| Mike Cooze (NL Alliance)6439.27%
||
|Betty Parsley
|-
| style="background:whitesmoke;"|Placentia-St. Mary's65.69% turnout
||
|Sherry Gambin-Walsh2,76447.39%
|
|Hilda Whelan2,24538.49%
|
|
|
|Steve Thorne (Ind.)82414.13%
||
|Sherry Gambin-Walsh
|}

Eastern Newfoundland

|-
| style="background:whitesmoke;"|Bonavista59.36% turnout
|
|Neil King2,56649.57%
||
|Craig Pardy2,61150.43%
|
|
||
|Neil King
|-
| style="background:whitesmoke;"|Burin-Grand Bank65.70% turnout
||
|Carol Anne Haley2,82251.62%
|
|Bill Matthews2,64548.38%
|
|
||
|Carol Anne Haley
|-
| style="background:whitesmoke;"|Placentia West-Bellevue65.69% turnout
|
|Mark Browne2,66744.23%
||
|Jeff Dwyer3,36355.77%
|
|
||
|Mark Browne
|-
| style="background:whitesmoke;"|Terra Nova64.25% turnout
|
|Colin Holloway2,59543.47%
||
|Lloyd Parrott2,87648.17%
|
|Barry Moores 4998.36%
||
|Colin Holloway
|}

Central Newfoundland

|-
| style="background:whitesmoke;"|Baie Verte-Green Bay59.96% turnout
||
|Brian Warr2,80949.73%
|
|Neville Robinson1,87233.14%
|
|Ben Callahan (NL Alliance)96817.14%
||
|Brian Warr
|-
| style="background:whitesmoke;"|Exploits64.65% turnout
|
|Jerry Dean1,92433.10%
||
|Pleaman Forsey2,87449.44%
|
| Gloria Cooper (Ind.)1,01517.46% 
||
|Jerry Dean
|-
| style="background:whitesmoke;"|Fogo Island-Cape Freels52.10% turnout
||
|Derrick Bragg2,81154.31%
|
|Sue Collins2,36545.69%
|
|
||
|Derrick Bragg
|-
| style="background:whitesmoke;"|Fortune Bay-Cape La Hune61.20% turnout
||
|Elvis Loveless1,75953.38%
|
|Charlene Walsh1,53646.62%
|
|
||
|Tracey Perry†
|-
| style="background:whitesmoke;"|Gander61.60% turnout
||
|John Haggie3,31158.57%
|
|Ryan Wagg2,34241.43%
|
|
||
|John Haggie
|-
| style="background:whitesmoke;"|Grand Falls-Windsor-Buchans60.75% turnout
|
| Al Hawkins2,58646.84%
||
|Chris Tibbs2,93553.16%
|
|
||
|Al Hawkins
|-
| style="background:whitesmoke;"|Lewisporte-Twillingate60.69% turnout
||
|Derek Bennett3,19054.00%
|
|Krista Freake2,71746.00%
|
|
||
|Derek Bennett
|}

Western Newfoundland

|-
| style="background:whitesmoke;"|Burgeo-La Poile52.13% turnout
||
|Andrew Parsons2,94783.46%
|
|Deborah Ann Turner58416.54%
|
|
|
|
||
|Andrew Parsons
|-
| style="background:whitesmoke;"|Corner Brook49.87% turnout
||
|Gerry Byrne2,43648.85%
|
|Tom Stewart1,68233.73%
|
|Mary B. Feltham73314.70%
|
|Wayne Bennett (Ind.)1362.73%
||
|Gerry Byrne
|-
| style="background:whitesmoke;"|Humber-Gros Morne68.11% turnout
||
|Dwight Ball4,24769.94%
|
|Greg Osmond1,82530.06%
|
|
|
|
||
|Dwight Ball
|-
|style="background:whitesmoke;"|Humber-Bay of Islands62.65% turnout
|
|Brian Dicks1,06817.20%
|
|Michael Patrick Holden65910.61%
|
|Shawn A. Hodder3104.99%
||
|Eddie Joyce (Ind.)4,17267.19%
||
|Eddie Joyce
|-
| style="background:whitesmoke;"|St. Barbe-L'Anse aux Meadows64.85% turnout
||
|Chris Mitchelmore3,47461.16%
|
|Sheila Fitzgerald2,03635.85%
|
|
|
|Ford Mitchelmore (Ind.)1702.99%
||
|Chris Mitchelmore
|-
| style="background:whitesmoke;"|St. George's-Humber60.23% turnout
||
|Scott Reid2,69150.17%
|
|Tom O’Brien2,16340.32%
|
|
|
| Shane Snook (NL Alliance)5109.51%
||
|Scott Reid
|-
| style="background:whitesmoke;"|Stephenville-Port au Port55.06% turnout
|
|John Finn2,48149.67%
||
|Tony Wakeham2,51250.31%
|
|
|
|
||
|John Finn
|}

Labrador

|-
| style="background:whitesmoke;"|Cartwright-L'Anse au Clair58.80% turnout
||
|Lisa Dempster1,13267.22%
|
|
|
|
|
|Michael Normore (Ind.)55232.78%
||
|Lisa Dempster
|-
| style="background:whitesmoke;"|Labrador West54.21% turnout
|
|Graham Letto1,36242.07%
|
|Derick Sharron50915.73%
||
|Jordan Brown1,36442.16%
|
|
||
|Graham Letto
|-
| style="background:whitesmoke;"|Lake Melville55.62% turnout
||
|Perry Trimper1,51745.84%
|
|Shannon Tobin1,18935.93%
|
|
|
|Jim Learning (Ind.)60318.22%
||
|Perry Trimper
|-
| style="background:whitesmoke;"|Torngat Mountains55.24% turnout
|
|Randy Edmunds47843.42%
||
|Lela Evans62355.58%
|
|
|
|
||
|Randy Edmunds
|}

Results 
The Liberals lost their parliamentary majority.

Incumbent MHAs who were defeated

Notes

References

Further reading 
 

2019
2019 elections in Canada
May 2019 events in Canada